= Power Home Remodeling Group =

American remodeling corporation

Power Home Remodeling
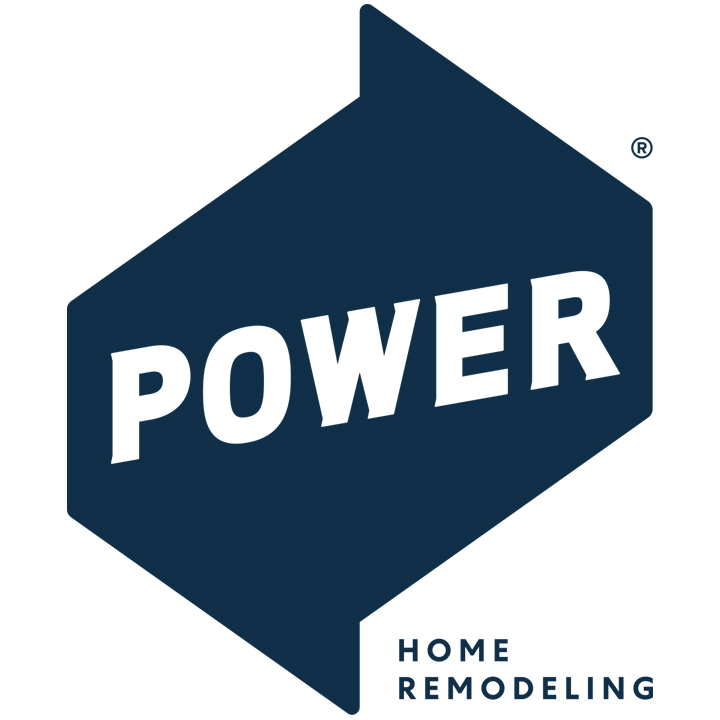
- Type: Private
- Industry: Exterior remodeling
- Founded: 1992; 34 years ago Chester, Pennsylvania, U.S.
- Founder: Jeff Kaliner, Adam Kaliner
- Headquarters: Chester, Pennsylvania, U.S.
- Area served: United States
- Key people: Corey Schiller, Co-CEO & Partner, Asher Raphael, Co-CEO & Partner, Timothy G. Wenhold, COO, CIO and Partner, Adam Kaliner, Co-Founder & Partner
- Products: Windows, siding, entry doors, roofing, attic insulation, gutters and gutter protection, solar panels.
- Revenue: ▲US$ 1 billion (2022)
- Number of employees: approx. 3,000
- Website: www.powerhrg.com

Power Home Remodeling is an American corporation headquartered in Chester, Pennsylvania that provides services predominantly related to exterior remodeling products such as replacement windows, roofing and vinyl siding.

== Overview ==
Power Home Remodeling was founded in 1992. In 2018, Qualified Remodeler listed Power as the largest residential re-roofer and the third largest home remodeling firm in the United States.
